Arcyptera is a genus of grasshoppers belonging to the family Acrididae subfamily Gomphocerinae. These grasshoppers are present in mainland Europe, and in the eastern Palearctic realm through to northeastern Asia.

Species
The Orthoptera Species File lists:
subgenus Arcyptera Serville, 1838
 Arcyptera albogeniculata Ikonnikov, 1911
 Arcyptera coreana Shiraki, 1930
 Arcyptera ecarinata Sjöstedt, 1933
 Arcyptera flavivittata Yin & Mo, 2009
 Arcyptera fusca (Pallas, 1773) - type species (as Gryllus fuscus Pallas) 
 Arcyptera orientalis Storozhenko, 1988
 Arcyptera tornosi Bolívar, 1884
subgenus Pararcyptera Tarbinsky, 1930
 Arcyptera alzonai Capra, 1938
 Arcyptera brevipennis (Brunner von Wattenwyl, 1861)
 Arcyptera kheili Azam, 1900
 Arcyptera labiata (Brullé, 1832)
 Arcyptera mariae Navas, 1908
 Arcyptera maroccana Werner, F., 1929
 Arcyptera meridionalis Ikonnikov, 1911
 Arcyptera microptera (Fischer von Waldheim, 1833)

References

External links
 
 
 Biolib

Acrididae genera
Gomphocerinae